The Roman Catholic Diocese of Pagadian (Lat: Dioecesis Pagadianensis) is a Roman Rite diocese of the Latin Church of the Catholic Church in the Philippines.

Created on November 12, 1971, the diocese was a suffragan of the Archdiocese of Zamboanga. With the ceding of the municipality of Margosatubig of the Ipil Prelature to the Diocese of Pagadian in January 1995, the diocese now has 24 parishes under its jurisdiction.  The catholic Christian population covered by the diocese is now 711,244 that comprises 72% of the total population of the area of about 2,860 square kilometers.

The pastoral structure of the Diocese of Pagadian is organized into three areas of responsibility:  consultative, judicial and administrative.  Among its educational centers are 1 seminary, 1 college, 16 high schools and 6 pre-schools. The diocese has experienced no jurisdictional changes.

Ordinaries

See also
Catholic Church in the Philippines

References

Pagadian
Pagadian
Pagadian
Religion in Zamboanga del Sur